Cristiano Xavier Gonçalves Carvalho, known as Xavi (born 13 March 1983) is a Portuguese football player who plays for Fafe.

Club career
He made his professional debut in the Segunda Liga for Fafe on 28 November 2016 in a game against Benfica B.

References

1983 births
People from Fafe
Living people
Portuguese footballers
AD Fafe players
Liga Portugal 2 players
Association football defenders
Sportspeople from Braga District